Samarium(III) nitrate is a odorless white-colored chemical compound with the formula Sm(NO3)3. It forms the hexahydrate, which decomposes at 50°C to the anhydrous form. When further heated to 420°C, it is converted to the oxynitrate, and at 680°C it decomposes to form samarium(III) oxide.

Synthesis
Samarium(III) nitrate is produced by the reaction of samarium hydroxide and nitric acid:

Uses
Samarium(III) nitrate is a lewis acid catalyst that is used to produce a nitrate precursor solution that is used as a nanocatalyst in the solid oxide regenerative fuel cells. The nanocatalyst is made by mixing samarium(III) nitrate hexahydrate, strontium nitrate, and cobalt(II) nitrate hexahydrate.

Samarium(III) nitrate is also used for the preparation of samarium doped ceria, which can be used in the fabrication of electrolytes for fuel cells. The samarium doped ceria is produced by mixing cerium(III) nitrate and samarium(III) nitrate together using triethylene glycol as a solvent for 5 hours at 200°C. Then it was dried for 4 hours at 110°C which resulted in a brown solid. Then it was heated up to 500°C for two hours which made the samarium doped ceria.

References

Samarium compounds
Nitrates
Acid catalysts